Andreas Keim (born 8 June 1962) is a retired German football player.

Honours 
 Fußball-Bundesliga runner-up: 1988–89

References

External links 
 

1962 births
Living people
German footballers
Association football defenders
Bundesliga players
2. Bundesliga players
Karlsruher SC players
Fortuna Düsseldorf players
FC 08 Homburg players
1. FC Köln players
Stuttgarter Kickers players
Tennis Borussia Berlin players
Footballers from Karlsruhe
20th-century German people